Van Houweling is a surname. Notable people with the surname include:

Douglas Van Houweling (born 1943), American academic
Molly Shaffer Van Houweling (born 1973), American cyclist, academic, and legal scholar

See also
Van Houwelingen